Marine Attack Squadron 233 (VMA-233) was an A-4 Skyhawk attack squadron in the United States Marine Corps. The squadron, also known as the “Flying Deadheads”, were part of the Marine Forces Reserve and were based at Naval Air Station Norfolk, Virginia until their decommissioning in 1969. Originally activated during World War II, they fought in many areas of the Pacific War including the Battle of Guadalcanal as part of the Cactus Air Force, the Battle of Okinawa and the Battle of Balikpapan (1945). They were the only Marine Corps squadron to have three commanding officers killed during the course of the war and were credited with downing 8 Japanese aircraft. Following the surrender of Japan, the squadron was decommissioned on March 10, 1946. They were reactivated as part of the Reserves but were again decommissioned in 1969.

History
The squadron was originally formed on May 1, 1942, at Marine Corps Air Station Ewa, Hawaii as Marine Scout Bombing Squadron 233 (VMSB-233) flying the SBD-4 Dauntless. They deployed overseas in December 1942 on board the seaplane tender USS Wright and first debarked at Espiritu Santo. From December 25, 1942, until February 8, 1943, they operated from Henderson Field on Guadalcanal as part of the Cactus Air Force.

They were reorganized as Marine Torpedo Bombing Squadron 233 (VMTB-233) on May 22, 1943, but the official re-designation of the squadron did not take place until June 13, when they had returned to the United States. From August until October 29, 1943, the squadron again operated from Henderson Field. Following the Battle of New Georgia the squadron was moved to Munda in New Georgia to conduct raids that would help cut off the Japanese garrison at Rabaul. While in the New Georgia area, they also operated from Piva Airfield and Torokina Airfield.

On February 14, 1944, Avengers from VMTB-233 and VMTB-232 took part in a mission to sow mines in Simpson Harbor at Rabaul. The TBMs were to fly up in three groups of eight each at the slow speed of 160 knots to drop their parachute-mines, weighing 1,600 pounds a piece. The first group lost one plane. The commanding officer tried to radio the other TBFs to warn them to turn back but he couldn't make radio contact. The second group lost two planes.  The third group was immediately found by searchlight and anti-aircraft guns while flying at 800 feet over the water and had five aircraft shotdown. A total of six planes and eighteen men were lost during the attack. Four of the eighteen men survived the loss of the six TBFs that evening. Of the four, none survived captivity. One was murdered at Tunnel Hill, two died of starvation / disease / medical neglect, and a fourth was murdered by the Japanese Navy sometime in April.

In April 1944, they returned to the United States and were stationed at Marine Corps Air Station Santa Barbara, California. During their time at MCAS Santa Barbara they trained as part of the Marine Corps' new escort carrier program. They were assigned to Marine Carrier Air Group 1 (MCVG-1) where they were partnered with VMF-511 on the USS Block Island. The squadron left the West Coast on March 20, 1945. During this time the squadron's commanding officer, Major Robert Vaupell, was killed in a crash in February 1945.

VMTB-233 saw its first action during the Battle of Okinawa on May 5, 1945, when it conducted rocket and bomb runs against Japanese strongpoints in the vicinity of Naha. Their mission alternated between close air support for the Marines fighting on the ground and strikes against Sakashima Gunto, a kamikaze base complex some 175 miles southwest of Okinawa on Miyako Island.

In mid-June, the Block Island was relieved from the coast of Okinawa and ordered to Leyte in the Philippines. From here they supported the early stages of the Australian 7th Division invasion of Balikpapan in July 1945. They returned to Leyte on July 4 and would not see combat for the rest of the war. Still aboard the Block Island when WWII ended, VMTB-233's final missions were flown in support of the Japanese surrender of Formosa.

Following World War II, the squadron returned to the United States, was briefly assigned to Marine Aircraft Group 46 (MAG-46) and was finally decommissioned on March 1, 1946, as part of the post war draw-down of forces.

Reserve years
The squadron was quickly reactivated later in 1946 as part of the Marine Air Reserves flying out of Naval Air Station Norfolk, Virginia. In October 1951 the unit was called to active duty for the Korean War, but it did not see action during the conflict. They were officially decommissioned in 1969.

See also

 United States Marine Corps Aviation
 List of active United States Marine Corps aircraft squadrons
 List of decommissioned United States Marine Corps aircraft squadrons

Notes

References

Bibliography

 

Web

 VMA-233 page @ www.skyhawk.org

233
1942 establishments in the United States
Inactive units of the United States Marine Corps
Military units and formations established in 1942